Benjamin Turner Ramsey (December 28, 1903 – March 27, 1985) was a Texas politician who served in a succession of offices during the mid-20th century. He served in both Houses of the Texas Legislature, as secretary of state, 34th Lieutenant Governor, and as member of the Texas Railroad Commission.

Ramsey was born on December 28, 1903, in San Augustine in San Augustine County in east Texas, the son of William Charles and Emma Jenkins Ramsey. He attended San Augustine public schools and worked on the family farm. After finishing high school, he worked three years in his father's law and abstract office, then enrolled at the University of Texas at Austin. He passed the state bar examination before graduation and was licensed to practice law in 1931. Ramsey was elected to the Texas House of Representatives and served two terms. Afterward he returned to San Augustine to practice law with his brother for five years. In 1940, he was elected to the first of two four-year terms to the Texas State Senate. He became a Senate leader in anti-deficit legislation and legislation to regulate labor unions. In 1949, Governor Beauford H. Jester chose Ramsey to be Texas Secretary of State. In 1950, Ramsey resigned from the position before being elected to statewide office as Lieutenant Governor of Texas and was re-elected in 1952, 1954, 1956, 1958, and 1960 for six two-year terms. When Governor Allan Shivers's conservative branch of Texas Democrats clashed with the state's more liberal Democrats, led by U.S. Senate Majority Leader (and future U.S. President) Lyndon B. Johnson and U.S. House Speaker Samuel T. Rayburn of Texas, the two factions agreed to support Ramsey as a member of the National Democratic Committee.

In fiscal affairs, especially opposition to higher taxes, Ramsey was considered conservative. Despite this, he supported Governor Shivers in raising revenue necessary for higher teachers' pay, state hospitals, and prisons. Like Shivers, he was an enemy of labor unions. He strongly supported rural electrification, water conservation and development, paving of farm roads, and stricter laws regulation what he called "fly-by-night insurance companies." On September 18, 1961, he resigned from the lieutenant governorship in the middle of his sixth term in office, after being appointed by Governor Price Daniel to the Texas Railroad Commission. The next year, he was elected to the unexpired term and in 1964 and 1970, was re-elected to full six-year terms. He served three two-year terms as chairman. Just before his appointment to the commission, Texas was successful in achieving control over offshore oil (see Tidelands controversy), and Ramsey helped composed the rules for Texas coastal drilling. He chose not to run for re-election to a third six-year term in 1976 and retired from public office in 1977 following 26 years in statewide elected office.

Ramsey was married to Florine Hankla of San Augustine, and the couple had three daughters, Rita, Ann and MariBen. He died on March 27, 1985 and was buried in San Augustine.

External links

Biographical sketch by Bob Bowman

1903 births
1985 deaths
Lieutenant Governors of Texas
Democratic Party members of the Texas House of Representatives
Secretaries of State of Texas
Democratic Party Texas state senators
20th-century American politicians
People from San Augustine, Texas